Robert F. Powelson is an American nonprofit executive and former  government official who currently serves as president and CEO of the National Association of Water Companies. He was a member of the Federal Energy Regulatory Commission from 2017 until 2018. Powelson previously served as a commissioner on the Pennsylvania Public Utility Commission from 2008 until 2017, and he is a past president of the National Association of Regulatory Utility Commissioners.

Powelson was previously president of the Chester County Chamber of Business and Industry. He has served on the board of directors of the Electric Power Research Institute and Drexel University.

Federal Energy Regulatory Commission
In May 2017, Powelson was nominated by President Donald Trump to become a member of the Federal Energy Regulatory Commission.

At his confirmation hearing, Powelson said he would work to address delays in the approval of natural gas pipelines and spoke favorably about liquefied natural gas exports.

He was confirmed by voice vote on August 3, 2017.

On June 28, 2018, he announced that he was resigning from FERC to become president and CEO of the National Association of Water Companies.

References

Living people
Saint Joseph's University alumni
University of Pennsylvania alumni
Trump administration personnel
21st-century American lawyers
Pennsylvania Republicans
Year of birth missing (living people)